Culi (possibly from Aymara for stripes of different colors on the shirt or undershirt which the Andean people wear) is a  mountain in the Vilcanota mountain range in the Andes of Peru. It is situated in the Cusco Region, Canchis Province, Checacupe District, and in the Puno Region, Carabaya Province, Corani District. Culi lies south of the mountain Otoroncane, west of Sapanuta, northwest of Pomanota and Jampatune and southeast of Sayrecucho and Tutallipina. The river Pomanota originates southeast of the mountain. It flows to the southwest as a tributary of Vilcanota River.

References 

Mountains of Cusco Region
Mountains of Puno Region
Mountains of Peru